The Department of the Environment was an Australian government department that existed between October 1997 and October 1998. It was the second so-named Australian Government Department.

Scope
Information about the department's functions and/or government funding allocation could be found in the Administrative Arrangements Orders, the annual Portfolio Budget Statements, in the Department's annual reports and on the Department's website.

At its creation, the Department was responsible for:
Environment and conservation
Meteorology
Administration of the Australian Antarctic Territory, and the Territory of Heard Island and McDonald Islands.

Structure
The Department was an Australian Public Service department, staffed by officials who were responsible to the Minister for the Environment, Robert Hill.

References

Australia, Environment
Environment
1997 establishments in Australia
1998 disestablishments in Australia
Australia